In a typical vertebra, the vertebral foramen is the foramen (opening) formed by the anterior segment (the body), and the posterior part, the vertebral arch.

The vertebral foramen begins at cervical vertebra #1 (C1 or atlas) and continues inferior to lumbar vertebra #5 (L5).

The vertebral foramen houses the spinal cord and its meninges. This large tunnel running up and down inside all of the vertebrae contains the spinal cord and is typically called the spinal canal, not the vertebral foramen.

See also
Atlas (anatomy)#Vertebral foramen

References

External links
 - "Superior and lateral views of typical vertebrae"
Vertebral foramen - BlueLink Anatomy - University of Michigan Medical School
 - "Typical Lumbar Vertebra, Superior View; Lumbar Vertebral Column, Oblique Lateral View"

Bones of the thorax